The  EMD F59PH is a four-axle  B-B diesel-electric locomotive built by General Motors Electro-Motive Division from 1988 to 1994. A variant, the F59PHI, was produced from 1994 to 2001. The F59PH was originally built for GO Transit commuter operation in the Toronto region. Metrolink in Southern California also purchased a fleet for its 1992 launch. The streamlined F59PHI was designed for Amtrak California intercity service. A total of 72 F59PH and 83 F59PHI locomotives were built.

F59PH
Between May 1988 and May 1994, 72 F59PH locomotives were built for two commuter transit railroads: GO Transit of Toronto and Metrolink of Los Angeles. The locomotives had a turbocharged EMD 12-710G3A, a 12-cylinder, two-stroke Diesel engine (prime mover). Head end power was supplied by a separate diesel generator.

GO Transit began retiring its F59PH locomotives in 2008 in favor of newer MPI MPXpress locomotives. Most were purchased by other operators including Exo (10 locomotives), Metra (3), NCDOT (11) for use on the Piedmont, and Trinity Railway Express (7). Five of the NCDOT units were rebuilt into cab control units without prime movers.

Seven Metrolink units were rebuilt as F59PHR. The non-rebuilt Metrolink locomotives were retired by 2020. Five of those were purchased by NCDOT in 2018.

F59PHI

The F59PHI is a variant with a fully enclosed streamlined carbody. The first nine units were purchased by Caltrans for use on Amtrak California services and entered service in 1994. It was the first locomotive in the United States which met California's stringent emission standards. Like the F59PH, the F59PHI is equipped with a secondary electrical generator – rated between  – for HEP. A total of 83 locomotives were built, most for commuter rail and Amtrak corridor services on the West Coast.

Two F59PHI locomotives were built in 1995 for Philip Morris Companies to haul the Marlboro Unlimited, a custom built luxury train to carry winners of a Philip Morris sweepstakes around the country. After Philip Morris cancelled the train, the units were stored, then, sold to Metrolink in 1998.

Some units are still in service with the original owners, while others have been retired. The 21 ex-Amtrak units were sold to Metra in 2018.

Notes

References

B-B locomotives
F59PH
F59PH
Passenger locomotives
Diesel-electric locomotives of the United States
Diesel-electric locomotives of Canada
Railway locomotives introduced in 1988
Amtrak locomotives
Standard gauge locomotives of Canada
Standard gauge locomotives of the United States